The Mocho Mountains are a mountain range in south-central Jamaica. It has been described as the "geographical center of Jamaica."

The area was historically a site for bauxite mining, which led to deforestation in the area.

Notes

References
Merriam-Webster's Geographical Dictionary, Third Edition. Springfield, Massachusetts: Merriam-Webster, Incorporated, 1997. .

Mountain ranges of Jamaica